Dartmouth is a coastal town in Bristol County, Massachusetts. Old Dartmouth was the first area of Southeastern Massachusetts to be settled by Europeans, primarily English. Dartmouth is part of New England's farm coast, which consists of a chain of historic coastal villages, vineyards, and farms. June 8, 2014 marked the 350th year of Dartmouth's incorporation as a town. It is also part of the Massachusetts South Coast. The local weekly newspapers are The Dartmouth/Westport Chronicle and Dartmouth Week. The Portuguese municipality of Lagoa is twinned with the town; along with several other Massachusetts and Rhode Island towns and cities around Bristol County.

The northern part of Dartmouth has the town's large commercial districts. The southern part of town abuts Buzzards Bay, and there are several other waterways, including Lake Noquochoke, Cornell Pond, Slocums River, Shingle Island River and Paskamansett River. The  town has several working farms and one vineyard, which is part of the Coastal Wine Tour. With a thriving agricultural heritage, the town and state have protected many of the working farms.

The southern part of Dartmouth borders Buzzards Bay, where a lively fishing and boating community thrives; off its coast, the Elizabeth Islands and Cuttyhunk can be seen. The New Bedford Yacht Club in Padanaram hosts a bi-annual regatta. The town's unique historic villages and selection of coastal real estate has made it a destination for generations as a summering community. Notable affluent sections within South Dartmouth are Nonquitt, Round Hill, Barney's Joy, and Mishaum Point. It also has a number of year-round residents and a variety of activities through the year. As of the 2020 census, the year-round population of Dartmouth was 33,783.

Dartmouth is the third-largest town (by land area) in Massachusetts, after Plymouth and Middleborough. The villages of Hixville, Bliss Corner, Padanaram, Smith Mills, and Russells Mills are located within the town. Dartmouth shares borders with Westport to the west, Freetown and Fall River to the north, Buzzards Bay to the south, and New Bedford to the east. Boat shuttles provide regular transportation daily to Martha's Vineyard and Cuttyhunk Island.

History

Early colonial history 
Before the 17th century, the lands that now constitute Dartmouth had been inhabited by the Wampanoag Native Americans, who were part of the Algonquian language family and had settlements throughout southeastern Massachusetts and Rhode Island, including Martha's Vineyard and Nantucket. Their population is believed to have been about 12,000.

The Wampanoag inhabited the area for up to a thousand years before European colonization, and their ancestors had been there longer. In John Winthrop's (1587–1649) journal, he wrote the name of Dartmouth's indigenous tribes as being the Nukkehkammes. The English explorer Bartholomew Gosnold in the ship Concord landed on Cuttyhunk Island May 15, 1602 and explored the area before leaving and eventually settling in the Jamestown Colony of Virginia.

Old Dartmouth 

In 1652, English colonists purchased Old Dartmouth—a region of  that is now Dartmouth, Acushnet, New Bedford, Fairhaven, and Westport—in a treaty between the Wampanoag—represented by Chief Ousamequin (Massasoit) and his son Wamsutta—and high-ranking "Purchasers" and "Old Comers" from Plymouth Colony: John Winslow, William Bradford, Myles Standish, Thomas Southworth, and John Cooke. 30 yards of cloth, eight moose skins, fifteen axes, fifteen hoes, fifteen pair of breeches, eight blankets, two kettles, one cloak, £2 in wampum, eight pair stockings, eight pair shoes, one iron pot and 10 shillings in another commoditie [sic]. 

According to the deed, in one year, all Natives previously living on the land would have to leave. This led to a lengthy land dispute as the deed did not define boundary lines, and the younger son of Massasoit, Metacomet, began to question the boundary lines of the purchase. Metacomet stated that he had not been consulted about the sale, and he had not given his written permission. The situation culminated with new boundaries drawn up by referees. Chief Massasoit gave his final permission to the changes in 1665.

Dartmouth was settled by English immigrants around November 1652, and it was officially incorporated in 1664. While the Europeans considered themselves full owners of the land through the transaction, the Wampanoag have disputed this claim because the concept of land ownership—in contrast with hunting, fishing, and farming rights—was a foreign concept to them.

Quakers 

Members of the Religious Society of Friends, also known as Quakers, were among the early European settlers on the South Coast. They had faced persecution in the Puritan communities of Plymouth Colony and Massachusetts Bay Colony; the latter banned the Quakers in 1656–1657. When the Massachusetts Bay Colony annexed the Plymouth Colony in 1691, Quakers already represented a majority of the population of Old Dartmouth. In 1699, with the support of Peleg Slocum, the Quakers built their first meeting house in Old Dartmouth, where the Apponegansett Meeting House is now located.

At first, the Old Dartmouth territory was devoid of major town centers, and instead had isolated farms and small, decentralized villages, such as Russells' Mills. One reason for this is that the inhabitants enjoyed their independence from the Plymouth Colony and they did not want to have a large enough population for the Plymouth court to appoint them a minister. There are still Quaker meeting houses in Dartmouth, including the Smith Neck Meeting House, the Allens Neck Meeting House, and the Apponegansett Meeting House, which is on the National Register of Historic Places.

King Philip's War 

The rising European population and increasing demand for land led the colonists' relationship with the indigenous inhabitants of New England to deteriorate. European encroachment and disregard for the terms of the Old Dartmouth Purchase led to King Philip's War in 1675. In this conflict, Wampanoag tribesmen, allied with the Narragansett and the Nipmuc, raided Old Dartmouth and other European settlements in the area. Europeans in Old Dartmouth garrisoned in sturdier homes—John Russell's garrison in Padanaram, John Cooke's home in Fairhaven, and a third garrison on Palmer Island.

Revolutionary war 
One of the minutemen signalled by Paul Revere spread the alarm of the approaching British forces into Dartmouth, after moving through Acushnet, Fairhaven, and Bedford Village. Three companies of Dartmouth Minutemen where marched out of the town on April 21, 1775 by Captain Thomas Kempton to a military camp in Roxbury, joining 20,000 other soldiers. Prior to the war Kempton had been a whaler in New Bedford. The additional two Dartmouth companies were led by Captain's Dillingham and Egery. The last Dartmouth town meeting called in the name of George III occurred in February of 1776. Also in 1776, and again in 1779, Dartmouth voters where called upon to sit on the Committee of Correspondence, Safety and Inspection, with the job of looking for individuals performing treasonous acts - and to report them to the War Council. Dartmouth had two companies of soldiers in the 18th Regiment of the Bunker Hill Army. No Dartmouth troops were ever again ordered north following March 17, 1776.

In 1793 Davolls General Store was established in the Russells Mills area.

Civil war 
The first troops to be sent to Washington, D.C. in Massachusetts were called by telegram on April 15, 1861 by Senator Henry Wilson. The Dartmouth men enlisted in the first call to arms, were enlisted in the 18th, 33rd, 38th, and 40th regiments. The first town meeting in Dartmouth related to the American Civil War was held on May 16, 1861.

David Lewis Gifford was a Union Army soldier from Dartmouth, who received the medal of honor. He enlisted in December 1863, at age 19 - as a member of  the 4th Massachusetts Cavalry Regiment. Following the steamer the USS Boston running aground on an Oyster bed, leaving 400 individuals within range of Confederate artillery. Gifford and four other men - led by George W. Brush - manned a small boat and ferried stranded soldiers to a safe area.

During the late 19th century its coastline became a summer resort area for wealthy members of New England society.

Modern history 
The Lloyd Center for Environmental Studies, located in South Dartmouth, is a non-profit organization that provides educational programs on aquatic environments in southeastern New England. It is across the mouth of the Slocums River from Demarest Lloyd State Park, a popular state beach known for its shallow waters.

The Dartmouth Natural Resource Trust in South Dartmouth, holds over 1,500 conserved acres of land. The property has 35 miles of hiking trails, and ocean and river walks. The Trust organizes such activities as photography tours, summer outdoor yoga series, bird watching, and plant identification. Its summer evening Barn Bash and winter fundraising auction are held annually.

Round Hill was the site of early-to-mid 20th century research into the uses of radio and microwaves for aviation and communication by MIT scientists, including physicist Robert J. Van de Graaff. There in 1933 he built the world's largest air-insulated Van de Graaff generator (now located at the Museum of Science (Boston)). It is also the site of the Green Mansion, the estate of "Colonel" Edward Howland Robinson Green, a colorful character who was son of the even more colorful and wildly eccentric Hetty Green.

In 1936, the Colonel died. The estate fell into disrepair as litigation over his vast fortune continued for eight years between his widow and his sister. Finally, the court ruled that Mrs. Hetty Sylvia Wilks, the Colonel's sister, was the sole beneficiary. In 1948, she bequeathed the entire estate to MIT, which used it for microwave and laser experiments. The giant antenna, which was a landmark to sailors on Buzzards Bay, was erected on top of a 50,000-gallon water tank. Although efforts were made to preserve the structure, it deteriorated and was demolished on November 19, 2007.

Another antenna was erected next to the mansion and used in the development of the Ballistic Missile Early Warning System. MIT continued to use Round Hill through 1964. It was sold to the Society of Jesus of New England and was used as a retreat house. The upper floors were divided into 64 individual rooms. The main floor was fitted with a chapel, a library, and meeting rooms.

In 1970 the Jesuits sold the land and buildings to Gratia R. Montgomery. In 1981, Mrs. Montgomery sold most of the land to a group of developers who have worked to preserve the history, grandeur and natural environment. The property is now a gated, mostly summer residential community on the water featuring a nine-hole golf course.

Geography
It is the third largest town by area in Massachusetts.

The town is accessible by Interstate 195 and U.S. Route 6, which run parallel to each other through the northern-main business part town from New Bedford to Westport on an east-west axis within a mile or two apart from one another.

Dartmouth includes the Southeastern Massachusetts Bioreserve that extends from Fall River into many protected forests of North Dartmouth in the Collins Corner, Faunce Corner, and Hixville sections of town.
The Southeastern Massachusetts Bioreserve actually extends its protected forest lands into the Freetown-Fall River State Forest and beyond.

There are many rivers that flow north-south in Dartmouth, such as the Copicut River, Shingle Island River, Paskamanset River, Slocums River, Destruction Brook, and Little River. Dartmouth is divided into two primary sections: North Dartmouth (USPS ZIP code 02747) and South Dartmouth (USPS ZIP code 02748).

The town is bordered by Westport to the west, New Bedford to the east, Fall River and Freetown to the north, and Buzzards Bay/the Atlantic Ocean to the south.

Transportation

Highway
Massachusetts Route 140 and Massachusetts Route 24 are located just outside Dartmouth's borders in New Bedford and Fall River, respectively, and both provide access to Boston and points north of the area. Massachusetts Route 177 begins just over Dartmouth's border with Westport, running west into Rhode Island and providing a link between the Newport-area (Tiverton, Little Compton, and Aquidneck Island) with the Fall River/New Bedford area. Interstate 195 and US Route 6 pass directly through Dartmouth, and also offer connections to the aforementioned three Massachusetts routes; the former provides access to Route 140, while the latter can be used to access Route 24 and Route 177.

Both Tiverton, RI and Little Compton, RI are geographically part of Massachusetts, lacking direct interstate highway connections with the rest of Rhode Island. Instead, smaller routes connect to the area (RI 138, MA/RI 24, RI 177/MA 177, and MA 81, and MA 88). Route 24 lies an average of 15 to 20 miles away in Tiverton, RI and Little Compton, RI, Massachusetts Route 177 and Massachusetts Route 140 and Massachusetts Route 24 are based upon old Indian routes and trails.

Bus
Public transportation in Dartmouth is primarily provided by the Southeastern Regional Transit Authority, which provides direct bus services between several points in Dartmouth and to the adjacent cities of New Bedford and Fall River. Transfers at either termini offer connections to T.F. Green Airport via Plymouth & Brockton Street Railway and various locales in Rhode Island via Peter Pan Bus; the latter company also offers connections from New Bedford to Cape Cod and Boston. Direct daily bus service from University of Massachusetts Dartmouth to Taunton and Boston was formerly offered via DATTCO buses; this service was cut back to only one express round-trip every Fridays in the wake of the COVID-19 pandemic.

Water
Despite its border along Buzzard's Bay, Dartmouth does not have any major water-based transport. However, the adjacent cities of Fall River and New Bedford offer several indirect ferry connections, with routes to Newport and Block Island from the former and Martha's Vineyard, Nantucket, and Cuttyhunk from the latter.

Rail
While Dartmouth and neighboring communities currently do not have any rail connections, construction of MBTA commuter rail stations is currently underway in Fall River and New Bedford as part of the South Coast Rail project. Upon completion, these will offer railway connections to cities including Taunton, Brockton, Braintree, and Boston.

A short segment of railway, officially known as the North Dartmouth Industrial railroad and informally referred to as the Watuppa branch, passes through northern Dartmouth after diverging from the New Bedford Secondary and eventually terminating in the nearby town of Westport. The primary operator of freight rail in Dartmouth is Bay Colony Railroad, which operates along the Watuppa branch and interchanges with Massachusetts Coastal Railroad in New Bedford.

Demographics

Government

Local government
Dartmouth is located in the Ninth Bristol state representative district, which includes all of Dartmouth as well as parts of Freetown, Lakeville, and New Bedford. The current state representative is Christopher Markey. The town is represented by Mark Montigny in the state senate in the Second Bristol and Plymouth district, which includes the city of New Bedford and the towns of Acushnet, Dartmouth, Fairhaven, and Mattapoisett. Dartmouth is the home of the Third Barracks of Troop D of the Massachusetts State Police, which relocated in 2006 from Route 6 to just north of the retail center of town on Faunce Corner Road. On the national level, the town is part of Massachusetts Congressional District 9, which is represented by William R. Keating. The state's junior (Class I) Senator is Ed Markey and the state's senior (Class II) Senator, is Elizabeth Warren.

Dartmouth is governed by a representative town meeting form of government, led by the Select Board.  The Town Hall is located in the former Poole School, which also served as Dartmouth High School for several years.  The town is patrolled by a central police department, located near Smith Mills on the site of the former Job S. Gidley School.  There are five fire stations in the town divided among three fire districts, all of which are paid-call departments.  There are two post offices (North Dartmouth, under the 02747 zip code, and South Dartmouth, under the 02748 zip code).

County government
The Bristol County Sheriff's Office maintains its administrative headquarters and operates several jail facilities in the Dartmouth Complex in North Dartmouth in Dartmouth. Jail facilities in the Dartmouth Complex include the Bristol County House Of Correction and Jail, the Bristol County Sheriff's Office Women's Center, and the C. Carlos Carreiro Immigration Detention Center.

Libraries 
Dartmouth established public library services in 1895. Today there are two libraries, the Southworth (Main) Library in South Dartmouth, and the Dartmouth Public Library - North Branch. The Southworth Library is part of the Sails Library Network, and shares a name with an older library. The older library, also called Southworth, was founded in 1878, by the pastor of the Congregational Church of South Dartmouth. The location of the Old Southworth library was purchased in 1888, and dedicated in 1890, due to funds from John Haywood Southworth - who furnished the library with 2,500 books in the memory of his father. At the time the library required the purchase of a 50 cent library card to borrow books. The library was acquired by town of Dartmouth in 1927. The building lacked space to contain books by 1958, and in April 1967 it was voted upon to build a new library with $515,000 on Dartmouth Street. In fiscal year 2008, the town of Dartmouth spent 1.5% ($865,864) of its budget on its public libraries—approximately $25 per person. Additionally, the Dartmouth Free Public library existed in Russells Mills, moving to various locations throughout the area - catering mostly to children at the local schools there.

Education

Dartmouth is governed by a single school department whose headquarters are in the former Bush Street School in Padanaram.  The school department has been experiencing many changes in the past decade, with the opening of a new high school, the moving of the former Middle School to the High School. The town currently has four elementary schools, Joseph P. DeMello, George H. Potter, James M. Quinn, and Andrew B. Cushman. The town has one middle school (located in the 1955-vintage High School building) next to the Town Hall, and one high school, the new Dartmouth High School, which opened in 2002 in the southern part of town. Its colors are Dartmouth green and white, and its fight song is "Glory to Dartmouth;" unlike the college, however, the school still uses the "Indians" nickname, with a stylized brave's head in profile as the logo which represents the Eastern Woodland Natives that first inhabited the area.

In addition to DHS, students may also attend Greater New Bedford Regional Vocational-Technical High School or Bristol County Agricultural High School.  The town is also home to private schools including Bishop Stang, and Friends Academy.

Since the 1960s, Dartmouth has been home to the University of Massachusetts Dartmouth campus, located on Old Westport Road, just southwest of the Smith Mills section of town.  The campus was the result of the unification of the Bradford Durfee College of Technology in Fall River and the New Bedford Institute of Textiles and Technology in New Bedford in 1962 to form the Southeastern Massachusetts Technological Institute.  The campus itself was begun in 1964 and its unique Brutalist design was created by Paul Rudolph, then the head of Yale's School of Architecture.  From 1969 until its inclusion into the University of Massachusetts system in 1991, the school was known as Southeastern Massachusetts University, reflecting the school's expansion into liberal arts.  The campus has expanded over the years to its current size, with several sub-centers located in Fall River and New Bedford.

The Dartmouth Natural Resources Trust
The Dartmouth Natural Resources Trust (DNRT) is a non-profit land trust. Incorporated in 1971, it works to preserve and protect Dartmouth's natural resources. The trust has protected over 5,400 acres of land since 1971 and owns 1,800 acres in Dartmouth as of 2020. The DNRT is accredited through the Land Trust Accreditation Commission, an independent program of the Land Trust Alliance. Since 1999, nearly 20 Boy Scouts from four troops have completed Eagle Scout projects through the DNRT.
 The Trust's headquarters building is located on the former Helfand Farm.

Culture

Dartmouth Community Band
The Dartmouth Community Band was established in 1974. The band plays regular summer concerts in Apponagansett Park as a part of the Dartmouth Parks and Rec. Summer Concert Series.

Notable people

 Frederic Vaughan Abbot (1858–1928), U.S. Army brigadier general (summer resident)
 Naseer Aruri (1934–2015), internationally recognized scholar-activist and expert on Middle East politics, U.S. foreign policy in the Middle East and human rights
 Ezekiel Cornell (1732–1800), member of Continental Congress 1780–1782
 Henry H. Crapo (1804-1869), 14th Governor of Michigan
 William W. Crapo (1830-1926, U.S. House Representative representing Massachusetts' 1st District
 David Lewis Gifford (1844–1904), U.S Medal of Honor recipient, regarding his service during the American Civil War
 Arthur Golden (born 1956), author, Memoirs of a Geisha (summer resident)
 Edward Howland Robinson Green (1868–1936), businessman
 Edith Ellen Greenwood (born 1920), first female recipient of the Soldier's Medal
 Huda Kattan (born 1983), CEO of Huda Beauty 
 Téa Leoni (born 1966), film and television actress (summer resident)
 Arthur Lynch (born 1990), former football tight end for the Miami Dolphins
 Lewis Lee Millett Sr., recipient of Congressional Medal of Honor (Korean War)
 Brian Rose (born 1976), former Major League Baseball player
 Philip Sheridan (1831–1888), Union general in the American Civil War who died at his summer home in Nonquitt
 Peleg Slocum (1654-1733), Quaker and proprietor of Dartmouth
 Pete Souza (born 1954), former Chief Official White House Photographer (2009–2017), grew up in Dartmouth
 Jordan Todman (born 1990), football running back for the Houston Texans
 Bernard Trafford (1871–1942), football player for Harvard University and chairman of First National Bank of Boston
 Benjamin Tucker (1854–1939), individualist, anarchist and egoist; English translator of the works of Max Stirner
 Donald Eugene Webb (1931–1999), longest fugitive on the FBI's Most Wanted List and prime suspect in the murder of a Pennsylvania Police Chief who made headlines in 2017 when his remains were discovered buried in his wife's backyard
Karen Polito (born 1966) Lt. Governor of Massachusetts (summer resident)

See also
Dartmouth, England
Dartmouth, Nova Scotia

In popular culture
The Terror Factor, a 2007 horror comedy film, is set in Dartmouth.

References

Further reading

External links

Town of Dartmouth official website

 
Towns in Bristol County, Massachusetts
Populated coastal places in Massachusetts
Populated places established in 1650
Providence metropolitan area
Towns in Massachusetts
1650 establishments in Massachusetts